Charlottetown Rural High School (CRHS), known colloquially as "The Rural", is a Canadian secondary school in Charlottetown, Prince Edward Island. Students who attend the school come from the north and east parts of Queens County, including the City of Charlottetown and the town of Stratford.

The school is administratively part of the Public Schools Branch on Prince Edward Island. Its official colors are red and white and the mascot is an osprey, also referred to as a Raider. The sports teams are called the Rural Raiders.

History and characteristics

In 1966, Charlottetown Rural High School was built in the growing suburban community of West Royalty, north of the municipal limits of the city of Charlottetown.

In 1994, the school was completely renovated to its present configuration, adding a new cafeteria and specialist instruction space. The renovations saw the building's exterior and interior remodeled using a modern design of unusual angles and curves that symbolize the waves which surround Prince Edward Island.

The school is currently the largest in the province in terms of student enrollment and second largest in terms of area.

The school offers both French and English language and the International Baccalaureate Diploma Programme.

Extracurricular activities

School sports

Sports offered at Charlottetown Rural include:

 boys' and girls' basketball
 boys' and girls' badminton 
 boys' and girls' cross country 
 boys' and girls' golf
 boys' and girls' rugby 
 boys' and girls' soccer
 boys' and girls' track and field 
 boys' and girls' volleyball 
 girls' field hockey
 girls' softball
 boys ' baseball
The Confederation City Classic is an annual basketball tournament hosted in early January by Charlottetown Rural. It draws 24 teams competing from across the Maritime Provinces and sometimes further afield. 2008 was the 25th year of the tournament.

Controversies

October 2021 student walk-outs 
On October 19, 2021, a walkout of approximately 200 students was organized using social media in regards to the dress code that applies to female students. Students, both male and female, from Charlottetown Rural and Colonel Gray High School attended the protest.

On October 22, a similar protest was organized by the parents of students at the school. The protests were also brought up in the Legislative Assembly of Prince Edward Island by MLAs Lynne Lund and Peter Bevan-Baker.

Charity projects
Every year the students and staff of CRHS take part in various fundraisers for charities.

Adopt a Family takes place each December. Homeroom classes are assigned a family, and given a list of what each member wants for Christmas. The students donate their own money and/or set up activities to raise money, then purchase the items. Each year dozens of families in PEI are able to have Christmas presents and dinners because of this.

Charities sponsored by the student council include:
 2006-2007 - Free the Children
 2007-2008 - Children's Wish Foundation of Canada
 2010-2011 - Free the Children

Notable alumni

Notable faculty 
 Mildred Dover, former English department head, former MLA, PEI Minister of Health and Social Services, and Speaker of the House
 Chester Gillan, former teacher; later served as a provincial cabinet minister in various roles including Minister of Education
 Robert Redmond, teacher and founder of the Outdoors Club; certified white-water canoeing instructor

See also
List of schools in Prince Edward Island
List of school districts in Prince Edward Island

References

External links
 

High schools in Prince Edward Island
Schools in Charlottetown
International Baccalaureate schools in Prince Edward Island
Educational institutions established in 1966
1966 establishments in Prince Edward Island